And the Horse You Rode in On is the seventh solo studio album by Australian singer/songwriter James Reyne released on 14 March 2005.  It's an acoustic recording of songs taken from his earlier solo work and Australian Crawl songs. It includes two new tracks. 
Later digital editions renamed this album as Greatest Hits Acoustic.

Review
Tomas Mureika of AllMusic said "The songs are produced in such a way as to spotlight [Reyne's] inimitable voice. Most of the songs are done strictly acoustically, with just Reyne and a guitar, although some are given different arrangements ("One More River" has been given an almost reggae beat, while "Any Day Above Ground" has an ironically funereal dirge about it). There are a couple of new tracks, "The Euphonious Whale" and "How to Make Gravy". This fascinating reimagining of a fantastic catalog of songs nicely reconnects with an artist who had entered the new century with the aggressiveness of Speedboats for Breakfast. Not your typical 'hits' record, And the Horse You Rode in On is all the more entertaining for it."

Track listing
 "Errol" (Guy McDonough, J. Reyne)
 "To Live's to Fly" (Townes Van Zandt)
 "One More River" (Reyne)
 "The Euphonious Whale" (featuring Daryl Braithwaite and Evie Von Bibra)  (Dan Hicks)
 "Reckless" (Reyne)
 "How to Make Gravy" (Paul Kelly)
 "Oh No Not You Again" (McDonough)	
 "Any Day Above Ground" (Reyne)
 "Mr Froggy Went a 'Courtin'" (traditional)
 "Slave" (Reyne, Jim Vallance)
 "Reno" (George Hutchinson, Reyne, Jennifer Kimball)
 "Hammerhead" (Reyne, Simon Hussey)
 "Stood Up" (John Hiatt)
 "Downhearted" (Bill McDonough, G.McDonough, Sean Higgins)
 "Stranger Than Fiction" (Reyne)
 "April Sun in Cuba" (with Mark Seymour)  (Marc Hunter, Paul Hewson)  (bonus track on reissued versions of the album)

Credits
 James Reyne – vocals, guitar, keyboards, drums
 Brett Kingman – guitar
 Scott Kingman – guitar
 Chris Hawker – guitar

Charts

Release history

References

2005 albums
Liberation Records albums
James Reyne albums